Thomas Bo Eriksson (born October 16, 1959) is a Swedish former professional ice hockey player. He played defense in the National Hockey League (NHL) with the Philadelphia Flyers and the Elitserien with Djurgårdens IF and Västerås IK.

On October 16, 1983, Eriksson scored a goal 32 seconds into a game played on his birthday. It established an NHL record for the earliest goal by a player on his birthday. The record was broken in 2009 by Tim Jackman of the New York Islanders.

Awards
 Bronze medal in Lake Placid Winter Olympic Games
 His number 27 is retired by Djurgårdens IF.

Career statistics

Regular season and playoffs

International

References

External links
 

1959 births
Djurgårdens IF Hockey players
Ice hockey players at the 1980 Winter Olympics
Ice hockey players at the 1988 Winter Olympics
Living people
Maine Mariners players
Olympic bronze medalists for Sweden
Olympic ice hockey players of Sweden
Olympic medalists in ice hockey
Philadelphia Flyers draft picks
Philadelphia Flyers players
Ice hockey people from Stockholm
Swedish ice hockey defencemen
Swedish expatriate ice hockey players in the United States
VIK Västerås HK players
Medalists at the 1988 Winter Olympics
Medalists at the 1980 Winter Olympics